The Tunisian National Guard is the national gendarmerie force of the Republic of Tunisia and separated from the Tunisian Armed Forces.

History
During French protectorate of Tunisia, the French national gendarmerie is tasked to maintain law and order in Tunisia. Shortly after Tunisia's independence, the Tunisian National Guard was created in 1956 by Beylical Decree of 6 September 1956 to replace the French national gendarmerie, which returned to France. Originally dependent on the ministry of Defense, the force was transferred to the Ministry of the Interior, due to President Habib Bourguiba's mistrust of the military.

Missions
Tunisian National Guard, along with Tunisian National Police, is the first line of defense against internal security threat. Tunisian National Guard role as stipulated in article 2 of Decree No. 2006-1162 on the special status of agents of the National Guard, are as follows:
 for maintaining public order, 
 preserving the security, 
 land and sea borders guards, 
 road/highway traffic and safety, public safety, 
 search for criminals and, 
 judicial investigations.

Organization

The Tunisian National Guard is led by a Director General, and consist of an inspectorate general and five directorate general, which are:

 Inspectorate General.
 Directorate General of Public Security. 
 Directorate General of Intervention Units. 
 Directorate General of Border Guards. 
 Directorate General of Common Services. 
 Directorate General of the Mutual of Civil Protection National Guard officials.

Aside of five directorate general, It also have Directorate which works directly under Director General of the National Guard:

 Directorate of Research and Investigation.
 Directorate of Anti-Terrorism.
 Directorate of Studies, Strategic plan and International Cooperation.
 The Special Unit.
 The Central Secretariat.
 The Central Operations Room

Naval Vessels and Aircraft
27 Naval Vessels
 6 patrol boats P350TN (140 t, 35 m), donated by Italy (2 delivered 12.2012; 3 delivered between 2013/2014; 1 will be delivery within 2.2015)
 7 patrol boats Classe 800/P58 (30 t, 17 m), donated by Italy middle years '00
 4 patrol boats Classe 700 (18 t, 15 m), donated by Italy in May 2011
 8 patrol boats Classe Squalo (13 t, 13,5 m), donated by Italy middle years '00
 2 motorboats Classe 500 (8,5 t, 11 m), donated by Italy in 2009/2011
3 Aircraft
 3 Bell 429 helicopters

Ranks 
Officer ranks

Other ranks

References

Military units and formations of Tunisia
Military units and formations established in 1957
1957 establishments in Tunisia
Gendarmerie